Sicyosperma is a genus of flowering plants belonging to the family Cucurbitaceae.

Its native range is Arizona to New Mexico and Northern Mexico.

Species:

Sicyosperma gracile

References

Cucurbitaceae
Cucurbitaceae genera